Nazarmaxram is a kishlak (village) in Shahrixon District, Andijan Region, Uzbekistan. It was the district center of Khaldyvanbek District, which was abolished in 1962.

References

Populated places in Andijan Region